The Federal Correctional Complex, Pollock (FCC Pollock) is a United States federal prison complex for male inmates in Louisiana. It is run by the Federal Bureau of Prisons, a division of the United States Department of Justice, and consists of two facilities:

 Federal Correctional Institution, Pollock (FCI Pollock): a medium-security facility.
 United States Penitentiary, Pollock (USP Pollock): a high-security facility with an adjacent satellite prison camp for minimum-security inmates.

See also
List of U.S. federal prisons
Federal Bureau of Prisons
Incarceration in the United States

References 

Pollock
Prisons in Louisiana
Buildings and structures in Grant Parish, Louisiana